The Metropolitan Cathedral of Saint Sebastian, commonly known as the Lipa Cathedral, is a Renaissance church in Lipa, Batangas, Philippines. The cathedral serves as the seat of the Archdiocese of Lipa. The cathedral was chosen as the seat of the then Diocese of the Lipa in 1910. Detached from the Archdiocese of Manila and canonically erected by Pope Pius X, it comprised what are today the provinces of Batangas, Quezon, Aurora, Laguna, Marinduque, Occidental Mindoro, Oriental Mindoro, and part of the Camarines area.

History

Earlier churches
Lipa was originally located close to the Laguna de Bombon, present-day Taal Lake. The Augustinian Chapter accepted Lipa under the name of "Convento de San Sebastian de Comintang", with Fr. Gabriel Rodriguez as the first prior. In 1608, it was made a vicariate directly under the father province. In 1610, it was given the right to vote in the provincial chapters.

In 1754, Lipa was submerged after the eruption of Taal Volcano. To avoid a similar occurrence, the town was transferred to its present site. A new church was begun by Fr. Ignacio Pallares in 1779 and by Fr. Manuel Galiana in 1787, and was completed in 1790. In 1865, Fr. Maueal Diez Gonzalez completed the spacious transept.

Fr. Benito Baras completed the construction of the church in 1865 and later built a bridge linking Lipa to Tanauan. On September 17, 1902, shortly after the Philippine Revolution of 1898, Pope Leo XIII issued the apostolic constitution Quae Mari Sinico mandating the reorganization of the church in the Philippines. His successor, Pius X, by papal declaration "Novas Erigere Ecclesias", erected five new ecclesiastical jurisdictions in the Philippines: the Dioceses of Lipa, Calbayog, Tuguegarao and Zamboanga, and the Prelature of Puerto Princesa.

In 1944, the cathedral was heavily damaged. It was later rebuilt by Msgr. Alejandro Olalla and Fr. Vergara, adding two side aisles, and completed on December 14, 1957.

References

External links

Roman Catholic cathedrals in the Philippines
Roman Catholic churches in Batangas
Buildings and structures in Lipa, Batangas
Roman Catholic churches completed in 1865
1865 establishments in the Philippines
Spanish Colonial architecture in the Philippines
Roman Catholic churches completed in 1959
1959 establishments in the Philippines
19th-century Roman Catholic church buildings in the Philippines
Neoclassical church buildings in the Philippines
Churches in the Roman Catholic Archdiocese of Lipa
20th-century religious buildings and structures in the Philippines